Burnside Ridges are three roughly parallel ridges running approximately northeast–southwest with their northeast extremities terminating at Matusevich Glacier. This area was photographed from the air by U.S. Navy Operation Highjump in 1947. The feature was sketched and photographed on February 20, 1959, by Phillip Law, leader of the Australian National Antarctic Research Expeditions (Magga Dan) expedition, and was named by the Antarctic Names Committee of Australia after Lieutenant Commander I.M. Burnside, Royal Australian Navy, hydrographic surveyor on the Magga Dan during the voyage.

References
 

Ridges of Oates Land